Anizah or Anazah is an Arabian tribe in the Arabian Peninsula, Upper Mesopotamia, and the Levant.

Genealogy and origins
Anizah's existence as an autonomous tribal group, like many prominent modern tribes, predates the rise of Islam in the 7th century CE.  The classical Arab genealogists placed `Anizah within the large Rabi`ah branch of Adnanite (North Arabian) tribes, alongside the tribes of Abdul Qays, Bakr ibn Wa'il, Bani Hanifa, and Taghlib.  In the genealogical scheme, `Anizah's eponymous ancestor is a great uncle of all of these.

Two main branches of Anizah are recorded by the early Muslim scholars.  One branch was nomadic, living in the northern Arabian steppes bordering Syria and Mesopotamia. The other, known as Bani Hizzan, was sedentary, living within the wadis of the district of Al-Yamama in eastern Nejd, just south of their purported cousins, the Bani Hanifa of the Bakr ibn Wa'il, who inhabited modern-day Riyadh.  Families tracing their origin to `Anizah through Hizzan still exist in that area today.

The other tribes of Rabi'ah were far more prominent in the events of late pre-Islamic Arabia and the early Islamic era (see Banu Hanifa, Taghlib, and Bakr).  According to historians such as Al-Tabari (10th century CE), `Anizah joined with Bakr ibn Wa'il under an alliance they called "al-Lahazim". Many of these tribes were followers of the Christian faith prior to Islam. Others such as bani Taghlib remained largely Christian even after the Islamic conquest of Mesopotamia and the Levant.

Bahrain's Al Khalifa, and Kuwait's Al Sabah royal families both trace their ancestry to this vast tribe. Saudi Arabia's Al Saud trace their ancestry to Anizah's cousin tribe, Bani Hanifa, which has merged with the larger tribe Anizah, and are therefore considered members of it as well.

History

Anizah in Hejaz
According to the historians Abu'l-Hasan Bayhaqi and Ibn Sa'id al-Maghribi, the Anizah tribe settled in the Hijaz region, specifically in Khaybar, at the end of the 10th century AD. Ali bin al Mugrab Al Uyuni mentioned the news of the Anizah tribe fighting rulers of Khaybar, al Jaafar al-Tayyar and expelled them from it. With the passage of time,  A part of the Anizah become Urban, while the other part remained on the Nomadic lifestyle.

`Anizah in Syria and Iraq

The modern tribe of `Anizah became prominent in the Ottoman era, as masters of the oasis towns of northwestern Arabia, particularly Khaybar and Al-'Ula.  Although not farmers themselves, the `Anizah levied crops from the inhabitants, and only spent the winter months in the area, while migrating northwards into southern Syria in the summer months, where they collected tribute from the inhabitants of the Hawran region.  The tribute was known as khuwwa ("brotherhood"), and in exchange, the tribesmen pledged to protect the farmers from other tribes.  Other clans of the tribe spread across the northern Arabian steppes as far north and east as the Euphrates.  According to Encyclopedia of Islam, "it is not known whence they came", while many such as the Western travelers Philby and Anne Blunt simply assumed they had recently migrated from Nejd, having been pushed northwards into Syria by other tribes.  However, the tribe does not appear in the historical or genealogical records of Nejd, and members of the tribe posit a migration from Syria and Iraq southwards to Nejd, which comports with the original lands of the Bakr ibn Wa'il.  In particular, it is believed they originated from the area of Ayn Tamr in the Iraqi desert near Karbala.  In the 19th century, the Swiss traveler Burckhardt and the British traveler Doughty visited the tribe in their stronghold of Khaybar and gathered from them many details of Bedouin life. 
Sheikh Medjuel el Mezrab of the Anizah was the husband of Lady Jane Digby.

One branch of the `Anizah in that area, centered around Al-Jouf and the valley of Wadi Sirhan and extending into Jordan and Syria, became so large and powerful that it practically developed into an independent tribe, known as the Ruwallah.  The Ruwallah engaged in battle with other branches of `Anizah, and also became the arch-enemy of the large tribe of Shammar, who inhabited roughly the same area and dominated Nejd in the late 19th century after temporarily deposing the Al Saud.  A 19th century oral poetic epic telling the tale of a rivalry between two heroes from Shammar and `Anizah was published in 1992.  The Ruwallah were among the tribes that took part in the "Arab Revolt" against the Ottomans in 1916.  Another northern branch of `Anizah, the `Amarat, was centered in the deserts of Iraq.

`Anizah in Nejd
The sparse chronicles of Nejd relating to the pre-Wahhabi era relate a process of penetration of the tribe into northern and western Nejd, where they began to claim pastures during the winter months.  One 19th-century historian, Ibn La'bun, a descendant of `Anizah who went by the tribal appellation of "Al-Wa'ili", recorded the story of the settlement of several `Annizi families in Nejd, which he placed in the 14th century CE.  In the 15th century, the region of Al-Qassim in northern Nejd was being rapidly settled through migration and the majority of this activity was by members of `Anizah. In the early 18th century the Bedouins of `Anizah are recorded to have reached as far as the gates of Riyadh, killing its ruler in battle.  This battle was part of a tribal war in which Riyadh and its neighboring villages took sides.

With the rise of the First Saudi State in the late 18th century, `Anizah were among the tribes that adopted a favorable attitude towards this new power, but took little active part in supporting it militarily, due to their geographical location.  The royal family of Saudi Arabia Al Saud family are the from the 'Anizah tribe, with Al Saud having ancestry from Wa'il, the region's native inhabitants as well as the migratory `Anizah.  The Saud intermarried with their 'Anizah rivals, al Shammar, along with other powerful tribes to solidify their dynasty. Ibn Saud sired dozens of children by his many wives. He had at most four wives at a time, divorcing many times, making sure to marry into many of the noble clans and tribes within his territory, including the chiefs of the Bani Khalid, Ajman, and Shammar tribes, as well as the Al ash-Sheikh.

Anizah in the 19th Century
Sheikh Mashaan Ibn Hathal was a 19th century cavalier, leader, and poet who gained his fame from leading the Tribe of Anizah across the Arabian peninsula and unifying it against the tribe's enemies at the Battle of Al Shimasiyah on 18 June 1825. Sheikh Mashaan died in the battle of Al Shimasiyah but the Anezis won consequently.

20th century
Limited settlement of Bedouin tribesmen in nearby towns and villages has always been an ongoing process in the region.  Settled families in `Anizah are to be found not only in Saudi Arabia, where they are most numerous, but also in Kuwait, Jordan, Iraq, Syria, Lebanon, United Arab Emirates, Qatar, Oman, Bahrain, Ahwaz (Iran) and the West Bank, where the village of Anzah near Jenin is reportedly named after the tribe.

The establishment of the modern borders of the Middle East dealt a severe blow to the Bedouin lifestyle of tribes such as `Anizah, which were accustomed to raising their animals over wide areas spanning many modern states.  Special arrangements were made in the early 20th century for these tribes, but the vast majority ended up settling within these new states and taking Saudi, Kuwaiti, Iraqi, Lebanese, Syrian, or Jordanian citizenship.  These recently settled tribesman are often distinguished from their sedentary cousins by retaining tribal appellations such as al-`Annizi or Al-Ruwaili as their surnames.

Notable people 
Among the tribe's members are:

 , chieftain of the Rabi`ah tribes in Pre-Islamic Arabia
 , Rashidun commander and governor of Mosul during the reign of Omar
 , companion of Muhammad
 , tābi and hadith narrator 
 Yahya ibn ʿUmar Al-Anezī, military leader of the Abbasid Caliphate
 Harith al-Muhasibi, Muslim scholar and founder of the Baghdad School of Islamic philosophy
 Abu al-Atahiya, Abbasid Classical poet
 , Sunni Sufi Master And Imam of al-Masjid al-Haram in the 10th century AD
 , influential writer, poet and historian who lived in the 18th century AD in eastern Arabia
 , historian who lived in the 19th century AD
 Abdulaziz al-Tuwaijri, Saudi politician
 Sa'd ibn Junaydil, Saudi historian and historical geographer 
 Abdul-Rahman Al-Sudais, General President for the Affairs of the Two Holy Mosques and one of the imams of the al-Masjid al-Haram
 Mohammed Salem Al-Anzi, Qatari football player
 Safaq Al-Anzi, Saudi Professional Shooter

Notable Families 
The Anizah tribe is historically divided into urban and nomadic families, the most prominent of which are:

 Al-Hathal : the sheikhs of the sheikhs of Anizah, they descend  from The Al-Hblan branch of Anizah. In the eleventh century AH/17th century CE, their grandfather Hathal Ibn Adenan led the Tribes of Anizah. Hathal Ibn Adenan was given the title of (Sheikh Al-Shuyoukh) by the Sheriff of Makkah, Saad Ibn Zeid (1666-1705).
Several stories about the way Hathal obtained the Sheikhdom were told, however Ibn Abar a notable Anezi Historian believes that history tells us that Hathal came to power when Makkah's Sharif was unable to collect the zakat of one of the tribes near Makkah and was disturbed about it, here Sheikh Hathal emerged and pledged to the sheriff to bring him the zakat of this tribe, and in fact this was done for him, and from here he was appointed as a general sheikh of the tribe of Anizah and was given the seal and the bundle of Sheikhdom. 
Ibn Abar quoted on this saying :

Hathal had two sons who were both considered Sheikhs : Sheikh Abdullah Ibn Hathal, and Sheikh Mndeel Al-Shuja' Or Mndeel the Brave. Their progeny are still regarded to be the Sheikhs of Anizah and are still given the honorary title of the Sheikhs of Shuyoukh of Anizah.

 Al-Awaji : sheikh of the tribe of Walad Suleiman,
 Al-Aida : sheikh of the tribe of Walad Ali,
 Al-Qaqa’a : sheikh of al-Qa’qa’ah from al-Rawla,
 Ibn Mujlad : sheikh of Al-Dahamisha,
 Al-Rafdi : Sheikh of Al-Salqa,
 Ibn Bakr : Sheikh of Al-Suwaylmat from Al-Dahamsheh,
 Ibn Dhbayan : Sheikh of Al-Mehlef of Al-Dahamsheh,
 Al-Taiyar : from the sheikhs of Walad Ali,
 Ibn Ghabin : Sheikh of Dana Kahil from Al-Fadaan,
 Ibn Muhaid : Sheikh of Al-Fadaan,
 Ibn Quaishish : Sheikh of Al-Kharsa and currently is also the sheikh of Dana Majid from Al-Fadaan, 
 Ibn Huraymis : Sheikh Al-Aqaqrah from Al-Fadaan, 
 Ibn Murshid : Sheikh of Sbaee,
 Ibn Hudayb : Sheikh of Al-Abedah from Sba’ah, 
 Ibn Aida : Sheikh of Al-Rasaleen from Sba’ah,
 Al Mana : From the Sheikhs of Al-Mehlef
 Ibn Shaalan : the sheikh of Al-Rawla, 
 Ibn Melhem : the Sheikh of Al-Manabaha, 
 Ibn Swailem : from the Sheikhs of Walad Suleiman, 
 Al-Faqeer : the Sheikh of Al-Faqara from Al-Manabha, 
 Ibn Ya’ish : the Sheikh of Al-Masalikh from Al-Manabha, 
 Ibn Dhwehr : from the sheikhs of Walad Suleiman,
 Ibn Ma’jil : the Sheikh of Al-Ashaja’ah from Al-Mehlef, 
 Ibn Jandal : Sheikh Al-Sawalmeh from Al-Mehlef, 
 Ibn Majid : the sheikh of Al-Abadla, from the Mehlef,
 Ibn Khael : the sheikh of the Tawala’, from the Walad Ali,
 Al-Murtaed : the sheikh of Al-Yemnah, from the Walad of Sulayman,
 Ibn Nasir :  the sheikh of al-Mr’ad, from al-Rawla.
 Al-Saud : rulers of Saudi Arabia, their relation to Anizah is disputed and is claimed to be maternal, Al Saud officially and are locally recognized paternally as part of Banu Hanifa.
 Al-Sabah : rulers of Kuwait 
 Al-Khalifa : rulers of Bahrain 
 El Assaad Family/AlSaghir Dynasty : rulers of Jabal Amel 1639-1971

See also
 Taghlib
 Bedouin
 Rabi`ah
 Ruwallah
 Banu Bakr
 Banu Hanifa
 Al Jalahma
 Ibn Sbyel
 Unaizah

References

Further reading

 (p. 584 ff)

Tribes of Arabia
Tribes of Saudi Arabia
Tribes of the United Arab Emirates
Tribes of Iraq
Tribes of Syria
Bedouin groups
Rabi`ah
Tribes of Kuwait